20th Century Masters – The Millennium Collection: The Best of Free is a greatest hits album by the band Free released through Universal Music Group. The collection spans the band's history from 1968 through 1973.

Track listing 
All songs were written by Andy Fraser and Paul Rodgers, except where noted.

Personnel
Paul Rodgers – lead vocals, rhythm guitar on (10, 11), piano
Paul Kossoff – lead guitar, rhythm guitar 
Andy Fraser – bass guitar, piano except on (10, 11) 
Tetsu Yamauchi – bass guitar on (10, 11) 
Simon Kirke – drums
Rebop Kwaku Baah – percussion on (10) 
John Bundrick – organ, piano on (10, 11)

References

Free (band) compilation albums
2002 greatest hits albums
Free
A&M Records compilation albums
Universal Music Group compilation albums

lt:The Best Of Free